Pigs on Purpose is the first studio album released by British post-punk band The Nightingales. It was released in 1982 through the Cherry Red record label and was distributed by Pinnacle. The album reached #15 in the UK Indie Chart.

James Robert wrote that the album was "a summation of their live set", but "let down by a flat production that didn't do justice to the duelling guitar thrust". 
Stewart Lee in 2004 wrote in The Sunday Times that it "is the CD reissue of the year".

Track listing 
 "Blood For Dirt" - 2:59
 "Start From Scratch" - 2:24
 "One Mistake" - 2:40
 "Well Done, Underdog" - 1:47
 "The Crunch" - 4:51
 "The Hedonists Sigh" - 2:25
 "It Lives Again!" - 3:01
 "Make Good" - 2:24
 "Don't Blink" - 3:58
 "Joking Apart" - 2:17
 "Yeah, It's O.K." - 5:15
 "Use Your Loaf" - 2:07
 "Blisters" - 4:29

The album was re-released in 2004, and included the band's 2nd, 3rd and 4th singles plus their respective b-sides. The debut single, "Idiot Strength", was not included. The additional tracks are:

<li> "Inside Out" - 3:01 (B-side to "Use Your Loaf")
<li>"Under The Lash" - 2:15 (B-side to "Use Your Loaf")
<li>"Paraffin Brain" - 2:57 (3rd single)
<li>"Elvis The Last Ten Days" - 2:50 (B-side to "Paraffin Brain")
<li>"Urban Ospreys" - 4:26 (4th single)
<li>"Cakehole" - 3:20 (B-side to "Urban Ospreys")

Personnel 
Paul Apperley - drums
Steve Hawkins - bass, vocal
Andy Lloyd - guitars, vocals
Nick Beales - guitars, vocals
Robert Lloyd - vocals, mouth organ

References

1982 debut albums
Cherry Red Records albums
The Nightingales albums